The following items are commonly used automotive acronyms and abbreviations:

5MT: 5-speed manual transmission
A4: 4-speed automatic transmission
A5: 5-speed automatic transmission
A6: 6-speed automatic transmission
ABS: Anti-lock braking system
AC: Alternating Current 
A/C: Air conditioning
ADAS: Advanced Driving Autonomous Systems 
ADB: Adaptive Driving Beam
AdvHEV: Hybrid vehicle 
AHC: Automatic height controller
AMT: Automated manual transmission
AFL: Adaptive front light
AFS: Adaptive front-light system
ATLS: Automated truck loading systems
Autogas: LPG when used as a vehicle fuel
AWD: All Wheel Drive
CAB 1493: California Assembly Bill 1493
CARB: California Air Resources Board
CCP: Coupled cam phasing
CH4: Methane
CNG: Compressed natural gas
: Carbon dioxide
CVVL: Continuous variable valve lift
CVT: Continuously variable transmission
DC: Direct current
DCP: Dual cam phasing
DCT: Dual clutch transmission
DeAct: Cylinder deactivation
dHCCI: Diesel homogeneous charge compression ignition
DMV: California Department of Motor Vehicles
DOHC: Dual overhead cam
DRL:  Daytime Running Lights
DSC: Dynamic stability control
DVVL: Discrete variable valve lift
DVVLd: Discrete variable valve lift, includes dual cam phasing
DVVLi: Discrete variable valve lift, includes intake valve cam phasing
eACC: Improved electric accessories
EAT: Electronically assisted turbocharging
EFI: Electronic Fuel Injection
EGR: Exhaust gas recirculation
ehCVA: Electrohydraulic camless valve actuation
emCVA: Electromagnetic camless valve actuation
EHPS: Electrohydraulic power steering
EPB: Electronic Parking Brake
EPS: Electric power steering
EMFAC: ARB emission factors modeling software (EMFAC2007 v.2.3 November 1, 2006)
ESC: Electronic stability control
ESP: Electronic stability program
EWP: Electric water pump
EWP: Elevating work platform
FDC: Fixed displacement compressor
FWD: Front-wheel drive
FTP: Federal test procedure
g/mi: grams per mile
GDI: Gasoline direct injection
GDI-S: Stoichiometric gasoline direct injection
GDI-L: Lean-burn gasoline direct injection
gHCCI: Gasoline homogeneous charge compression ignition
GHG: Greenhouse gas
GT: Gran/Grand turismo
GVW: Gross vehicle weight
GVWR: Gross vehicle weight rating
GWP: Global warming potential
HAD: Highly Autonomous Driving
HC: Hydrocarbons
HEV: Hybrid-electric vehicle
HFC: Hydrofluorocarbon
hp: Horsepower
HSDI: High-speed (diesel) direct injection
ICP: Intake cam phaser
IGN: Ignition
ImpAlt: Improved efficiency alternator
ISG: Integrated starter-generator system
ISG-SS: Integrated starter-generator system with start-stop operation
L4: In-line four-cylinder
LDT: Light-duty truck
LDT1: a light-duty truck with a loaded vehicle weight of up to 3750 pounds.
LDT2: an LEV II light-duty truck with a loaded vehicle weight of 3751 pounds to a gross vehicle weight of 8500 pounds
LED: Light Emitting Diode
LEV: Low-emission vehicle
LPG: Liquified petroleum gas
LVW: Loaded vehicle weight
MAC: Mobile air conditioning
MDPV: Medium-duty passenger vehicle
MDV: Medium-duty vehicle
mg/mi: Milligrams per mile
ModHEV: Moderate hybrid
MT: Manual Transmission
NMOG: Non-methane organic gas
N2O: Nitrous oxide
NOx: Oxides of nitrogen
PB: Power brakes
PC: passenger car
RPM: Revolutions Per Minute
PS: Power steering
R-134a: Refrigerant 134a, tetrafluoroethane (C2H2F4)
R-152a: Refrigerant 152a, difluoroethane (C2H4F2)
RPE: Retail price equivalent
RWD:  Rear Wheel Drive
SULEV: Super ultra low emission vehicle
SUV: Sport utility vehicle
TBI: Throttle body injection
TCS: Traction control system
TRR: Tire rolling resistance
Turbo: Turbocharging
ULEV: Ultra low emission vehicle
V6: Vee-formation six-cylinder
V8: V-formation eight-cylinder
VDC: Variable displacement compressor
ZEV: Zero-emission vehicle
4WD: Four-wheel-drive
42V ISG: 42-volt integrated starter-generator system

References

 
acronyms